Bernard Lopez de Roberts (Paris, 1813 - Paris, 30 May 1896) was a 19th-century French playwright of Spanish origin.

His plays were given on the most important Parisian stages of his time, including the Théâtre du Vaudeville, the Théâtre de la Gaîté, the Théâtre des Variétés, and the Théâtre de l'Ambigu-Comique.

Works 

1839: Le Tribut des cent vierges, drama in 5 acts, with Pujol
1840: Les Pages et les poissardes, ou la Cour et la Halle, comédie-vaudeville in 2 acts, with Edmond Rochefort
1840: Aubray le médecin, melodrama in 3 acts, with Charles Desnoyer
1842: Les Chevau-légers de la Reine, comedy in 3 acts, mingled with song, with Charles Dupeuty
1843: La Chasse aux belles-filles, ou Garçon à marier, vaudeville in 4 acts, with Laurencin
1844: Turlurette, comédie-vaudeville in 1 act
1846: Les Frères Dondaine, vaudeville in 1 act, with Charles Varin
1847: Le Phare de Bréhat, ou Un, deux et trois, comédie-vaudeville in 1 act, with Edmond de Biéville
1847: Jacques le Fataliste, comédie-vaudeville in 2 acts, with Clairville and Dumanoir
1847: Regardez mais ne touchez pas !, swashbuckling comedy, with Théophile Gautier.
1848: La Taverne du Diable, drama in 5 acts and 6 tableaux, with Pujol
1848: Mademoiselle de Choisy, comedy vaudeville in 1 act, with Henri de Saint-Georges
1848: Roger Bontemps, vaudeville in 1 act, with Clairville
1849: Les beautés de la cour, comédie-vaudeville in 2 acts, with Jules-Édouard Alboize de Pujol
1852 L'imagier de Harlem ou La découverte de l'imprimerie, drame-légende extravaganza, in 5 acts and 10 tableaux, in prose and in verse, with Joseph Méry and Gérard de Nerval
1852 Les Filles sans dot, comedy in 3 acts, in prose, with Auguste Lefranc
1852: Le Sage et le fou, comedy in 3 acts, in verse, with Méry
1854:Grégoire, vaudeville in 1 act, with Hippolyte Cogniard
1854: Thibaud l'ébéniste, comédie-vaudeville en 1 act
1855: Frère et sœur, drama in 5 acts, with Joseph Méry
1858: Les trois Nicolas, opéra comique in 3 acts, with Gabriel de Lurieu and Eugène Scribe
1859: Paris hors Paris, vaudeville in 3 acts and 4 parts, with Clairville
1860: Trottmann le touriste, comédie-vaudeville in 3 acts, with Charles Narrey
1863: La Veillée allemande, drama in 1 act, with Alexandre Dumas
1864: La Fiancée aux millions, comedy in 3 acts, in verse, with Méry
1864: Robert Surcouf, drama in 5 acts and 8 tableaux, with Eugène Grangé
1866: L'Amour est un enfant, comedy in 1 act
1866:Les Français à Lisbonne, chronique militaire in 4 acts
1870: La Rue des Marmousets, comedy in 3 acts, with Alfred Delacour
1873: L'Eau qui dort, vaudeville-proverbe in 1 act, with Charles Narrey
1876: Le Vœu inutile, comedy in 1 act, in verse
1879: Les Ricochets du divorce, comedy in 4 acts, in prose

Bibliography 
 Gustave Vapereau, Dictionnaire universel des contemporains, vol.2, 1870,  (Read online)
 Marie-Odile Mergnac, Les noms de famille en France: histoires et anecdotes, 2000,

References 

French librettists
19th-century French dramatists and playwrights
1813 births
Writers from Paris
1896 deaths